The 2015 Ontario Scotties Tournament of Hearts, the provincial women's curling championship for Southern Ontario, was held January 19 to 25 at the Penetanguishene Curling Club in Penetanguishene, Ontario. The winning Julie Hastings team represented Ontario at the 2015 Scotties Tournament of Hearts in Moose Jaw, Saskatchewan.

The event marked the first tournament to exclude teams from Northern Ontario, which began to have its own entry into the Scotties, the 2015 Northern Ontario Scotties Tournament of Hearts.

Qualification Process
Due to the exclusion of Northern Ontario, qualifying for the provincial Scotties changed for 2015. Ten teams still qualify for the provincial tournament; two teams qualified from each of the four Ontario Curling Association regions, one team qualified from a second-chance Challenge Round, while the defending champion team (Allison Flaxey rink) automatically qualified.

The defending two-time national Scotties champion Rachel Homan rink once again did not participate in the qualification process, as her team won the 2014 Scotties Tournament of Hearts and therefore continued to represent Team Canada at the 2015 Scotties Tournament of Hearts.

Teams

Round-robin standings

Round-robin results

Draw 1
Monday, January 19, 7:00 pm

Draw 2
Tuesday, January 20, 2:00 pm

Draw 3
Tuesday, January 20, 7:00 pm

Draw 4
Wednesday, January 21, 2:00 pm

Draw 5
Wednesday, January 21, 7:00 pm

Draw 6
Thursday, January 22, 2:00 pm

Draw 7
Thursday, January 22, 7:00 pm

Draw 8
Friday, January 23, 2:00 pm

Draw 9
Friday, January 23, 7:00 pm

Playoffs

3 vs. 4
Saturday, January 24, 2:00 pm

1 vs. 2
Saturday, January 24, 7:00 pm

Semifinal
Sunday, January 25, 9:30 am

Final
Sunday, January 25, 4:00 pm

Qualification
Southern Ontario zones will run from December 12-December 21, 2014. Two teams from each zone qualify for regionals.

Regional Qualifiers In Bold

Zone Qualification

Zone 1
December 12–14, at the RCMP Curling Club, Ottawa

Teams entered:

Jennifer Harvey (Conrwall)
Erin Morrissey (Ottawa)
Danielle Inglis (Ottawa)

All teams qualified due to lack of teams in Region.

Zone 2
December 12–14, at the RCMP Curling Club, Ottawa

Teams entered:

Celeste Butler-Rohland (Rideau)
Rhonda Varnes (Rideau)
Jaqui Lavoie (Rideau)

All teams qualified due to lack of teams in Region (event still held, however).

Bracket:

Zone 3
December 12–14, at the RCMP Curling Club, Ottawa

Teams entered:

Brit O'Neill (City View)

Due to lack of entries in region, no other team qualified from this zone.

Zone 4
December 19–21, at the Napanee & District Curling Club, Napanee

Teams entered:
No teams entered (4A filled by Jennifer Harvey; 4B filled by Jacquie Lavoie)

Zone 5
Teams entered:

Emma Joyce (Lindsay) (automatically qualifies as only team)

One additional team will be selected from Zone 8.

Zone 6
December 6–7, at the Unionville Curling Club, Unionville

Teams entered:

Susan McKnight (Uxbridge)
Janet McGhee (Unionville)
Stephanie Van Huyse (Whitby)

Brackets:

Zone 7
Teams entered:

Julie Hastings (Bayview)
Courtney de Winter (Richmond Hill)

Both teams qualify as there were no other entries.

Zone 8
December 13–14, at the Dixie Curling Club, Mississauga

Teams entered:

Clancy Grandy (Mississaugua)
Megan Balsdon (Dixie)
Kelly Cochrane (High Park)
Samantha Peters (Royal Canadian)
Susan Baird (Dixie)

(One additional team qualifies to fill vacancy in Zone 5)

Brackets:

Zone 9
December 19–21, at The Club at North Halton, Georgetown

Teams entered:

Emma Joyce (Orangeville) (automatically qualifies as only team)

Due to lack of entries in Region 2, no additional team will be selected for this zone.

Zone 10
Teams entered:

Sherry Middaugh (Coldwater)
Peggy Darmody (Penetanguishene)

Both teams qualify as there were no other entries.

Zone 11

No teams entered.

Zone 12
December 13 at the Galt Country Club, Gambridge

Teams entered:

Courtney Gilder (Kitchener-Waterloo Granite)
Shannon Kee (Westmount)

Both teams qualify as there were no other entries.

Zone 13
December 6, at the Glendale Golf & Country Club, Hamilton

Teams entered:

Caitlin Romain (Glendale)
Mallory Kean (Glendale)
Marilyn Bodogh (St. Catharines Golf)
Michelle Fletcher (Burlington)

Brackets:

Zone 14
Teams entered:

Cathy Auld (Listowel) (automatically qualifies as only team)

One additional team will be selected from Zone 13.

Zone 15
December 13, at the Brantford Golf & Country Club, Brantford

Teams entered:

Jacqueline Harrison (Brant)
Chantal Lalonde (Woodstock)
Amie Shackleton (St. Marys)

Brackets:

Zone 16
December 13, at the Chatham Granite Club, Chatham

Teams entered:
Chrissy Cadorin (London)
Bethany Heinrichs (Ilderton)
Dianne Dykstra (Chatham Granite)

Brackets:

Regional Qualification

Region 1
January 3–4 at the Smiths Falls Curling Club, Smiths Falls

Region 2
January 3–4 at the Oshawa Golf and Curling Club, Oshawa

Region 3
January 3–4 at the Alliston Curling Club, Alliston

Region 4
January 3–4 at the Grimsby Curling Club, Grimsby

Challenge Round
January 10–11, Brockville Country Club, Brockville

(Hastings must be beaten twice)

References

External links

Ontario Scotties Tournament of Hearts
Penetanguishene
Ontario Scotties Tournament of Hearts
Ontario Scotties Tournament of Hearts